Jiju Township is a township under the administration of Kangding in western Sichuan, China.

, it has five villages under its administration:
Jiju Village
Mati Village
Geba Village
Songyu Village
Caiyu Village

References 

Township-level divisions of Sichuan
Kangding